The Protocol to the 1979 Convention on Long-Range Transboundary Air Pollution Concerning the Control of Emissions of Volatile Organic Compounds or Their Transboundary Fluxes (known as the Volatile Organic Compounds Protocol or the VOC Protocol) is a protocol to the Convention on Long-Range Transboundary Air Pollution which aims to provide for the control and reduction of emissions of volatile organic compounds in order to reduce their transboundary fluxes so as to protect human health and the environment from adverse effects. The protocol was concluded at Geneva, Switzerland.

Opened for signature - November 18, 1991

Entered into force - September 29, 1997

Parties - (24) Austria, Belgium, Bulgaria, Croatia, Czech Republic, Denmark, Estonia, Finland, France, Germany, Hungary, Italy, Liechtenstein, Lithuania, Luxembourg, Republic of Macedonia, Monaco, Netherlands, Norway, Slovakia, Spain, Sweden, Switzerland, United Kingdom

Countries that have signed, but not yet ratified - (6) Canada, European Union, Greece, Portugal, Ukraine, United States

See also
 environmental agreements

References

External links
Ratification status

Environmental treaties
Treaties concluded in 1991
1991 in Switzerland
Treaties entered into force in 1997
Air pollution
1997 in the environment
Convention on Long-Range Transboundary Air Pollution
Volatile organic compound abatement
United Nations Economic Commission for Europe treaties
Treaties of Austria
Treaties of Belgium
Treaties of Bulgaria
Treaties of Croatia
Treaties of the Czech Republic
Treaties of Denmark
Treaties of Estonia
Treaties of Finland
Treaties of France
Treaties of Germany
Treaties of Hungary
Treaties of Italy
Treaties of Liechtenstein
Treaties of Lithuania
Treaties of Luxembourg
Treaties of Monaco
Treaties of the Netherlands
Treaties of Norway
Treaties of Slovakia
Treaties of Spain
Treaties of Sweden
Treaties of Switzerland
Treaties of North Macedonia
Treaties of the United Kingdom
Treaties extended to Guernsey
Treaties extended to the Isle of Man
Treaties extended to Jersey